The 1979–80 IHL season was the 35th season of the International Hockey League, a North American minor professional league. Ten teams participated in the regular season, and the Kalamazoo Wings won the Turner Cup.

Regular season

Turner Cup-Playoffs

External links
 Season 1979/80 on hockeydb.com

IHL
International Hockey League (1945–2001) seasons